Villers-au-Tertre is a commune in the Nord department in northern France. It is around 10 km south-east of Douai.

Surrounding communes
Neighbouring communes are Erchin to the north, Monchecourt to the east, Fressain to the south-east and Bugnicourt to the south-west.

Heraldry

Unwelcome fame
Villers-au-Tertre hit the headlines at the end of July 2010 because the new owner of a house in the village, while trying to plant a tree, found the bones of two newly born children buried in the garden. Subsequently six more bodies were discovered at the recently acquired home of the former proprietor's daughter and son in law.  The presumed mother of the deceased children has been placed under judicial investigation

See also
Communes of the Nord department

References

Villersautertre